Esquimalt—Juan de Fuca is a former federal electoral district in the province of British Columbia, Canada, which was represented in the House of Commons of Canada from 1988 to 2015

Demographics

Geography
It initially consisted of:
 the Esquimalt District Municipality and the City of Colwood;
 Electoral Area D of the Capital Regional District, the southwest part of Electoral Area B, the southwest part of Electoral Area E'
 the southwest part of Saanich District Municipality,
 the southeast part of Cowichan Valley Regional District, and
 Metchosin District Municipality.

History
The riding was created in 1988 from Esquimalt—Saanich and Cowichan—Malahat—The Islands ridings.

Members of Parliament

This riding has elected the following Members of Parliament:

Election results

See also
 List of Canadian federal electoral districts
 Past Canadian electoral districts

References

 Library of Parliament Riding Profile
 Expenditures - 2008
 Expenditures - 2004
 Expenditures – 2000
 Expenditures – 1997

Notes

External links
 Website of the Parliament of Canada
 Map of riding archived by Elections Canada

Defunct British Columbia federal electoral districts on Vancouver Island